Bojan Božović (Cyrillic: Бојан Божовић; born 3 February 1985) is a Montenegrin retired professional footballer who played as a striker. The last club he played for on a professional level was FK Sutjeska Nikšić.

Club career
He started playing with FK Kom from where he moved to Belgrade to join FK Hajduk Beograd but spend most of the time playing on loan at FK BPI Pekar.

Due to a broken foot, Božović missed a transfer to Hamburg during the winter break of the 2008-09 season. He signed a two-year contract with Belgian Jupiler League side Cercle Brugge in June 2009. His former teams are the Montenegrin FK Kom, Serbian FK Hajduk Beograd and Hungarian teams Békéscsaba Előre, Budapest Honvéd and Kaposvári Rákóczi.

He scored his first goal for Cercle against Lokeren on 17 October 2009: an equalizer (1-1) in the last minute of injury time. 27 October, Božović made both goals in the 2-0 cup victory against OH Leuven and went on to score two winning goals against R.S.C. Anderlecht helping Cercle to reach the cup final. He finished as top scorer of Belgium cup 2009–10. In preseason 2010-11 he was told by the board of Cercle Brugge that he had to leave the club. He didn't find a team to play in before closing of the transfer period and was dropped out of the first team squad. He played a whole year with the reserve squad before moving to Hungarian team BFC Siófok.

In summer 2012 he returned to Serbia joining his former club FK Hajduk Beograd, playing now in the Serbian League Belgrade.

During the first half of 2013 he played with Chainat in Thailand, and in summer 2013 he returned to Serbia and joined FK Bežanija. During the winter break of the 2013–14 season he moved to a Serbian SuperLiga side FK Napredak Kruševac.

During the winter break of the 2014–15 season, a year after joining Napredak, he moved to Saudi Arabia and joined Al-Shoalah.

International career
Bojan Božović has been a youth international. He has already been called up to represent Montenegro at senior level, but has no appearances so far.

References

External links
"Belgium Cup 2009-2010 Soccer Statistics and Results"
Bojan Božović player info at the official Cercle Brugge website 

1985 births
Living people
Footballers from Podgorica
Association football forwards
Serbia and Montenegro footballers
Montenegrin footballers
FK Kom players
FK Hajduk Beograd players
Békéscsaba 1912 Előre footballers
Budapest Honvéd FC players
Kaposvári Rákóczi FC players
Cercle Brugge K.S.V. players
BFC Siófok players
Bojan Bozovic
FK Bežanija players
FK Napredak Kruševac players
Al-Shoulla FC players
FK Spartak Subotica players
Manama Club players
FK Sutjeska Nikšić players
Second League of Serbia and Montenegro players
Nemzeti Bajnokság I players
Belgian Pro League players
Bojan Bozovic
Serbian First League players
Serbian SuperLiga players
Saudi Professional League players
Bahraini Premier League players
Montenegrin First League players
Montenegrin expatriate footballers